The T1, officially referred to as the T1 Kabataş–Bağcılar tram line is a tram line of the Istanbul Tram, operated by Metro Istanbul.

History
The first section of the T1 opened between Aksaray and Beyazıt on 13 June 1992 and was later extended first to Topkapı and Zeytinburnu, and later to Eminönü. On 29 June 2006, the Eminönü–Kabataş extension was opened, making the transfer to Kabataş–Taksim funicular possible. On 3 February 2011, the T1 merged with the T2 which opened in 2006 between Zeytinburnu and Bağcılar, with the T2's stations being converted to low-floor.

Rolling stock
At the time of opening in 1992 the T1 used high-floor trams manufactured by ABB. These have subsequently been replaced by two types of low-floor tram, which are currently in use on the line. Both types are air conditioned and usually run in coupled pairs.

Bombardier Flexity Swift A32

In 2001 the Istanbul Transport Authority placed an order for 55 Bombardier Flexity Swift A32 trams. They entered service in 2003, once the platforms on the line had been lowered to accommodate low-floor trams. They have a top speed of 70 km/h, a total of 64 seats + 10 tip-up seats, and a maximum capacity of 272 passengers.

Alstom Citadis X04

In 2007, 37 Alstom Citadis X04 trams were ordered to replace the high-floor trams running on the T2 Zeytinburnu-Bağcılar line, in anticipation of the merger of the T1 and T2 lines and the conversion of the former T2 line platforms to low-floor height. The first tram was delivered in September 2009, and following testing the trams entered service in 2011. They also have a top speed of 70 km/h, and a maximum capacity of up to 500 passengers as a coupled pair.

Stations

Planned extensions
In 2022 a special service for cruise passengers was announced which would run for cruise passengers from a new infill stop in Galataport (south of Kabataş station) and run to the Beyazıt station, providing visitors easy access to the Grand Bazaar at that stop as well as the rest of Sultanahmet, Istanbul's Old City.

Metro line M7 is being extended southeastward to Beşiktaş and Kabataş, which will provide T1 passengers much easier access to Şişli and other parts of the Istanbul Central Business District.

See also
 Istanbul Tram
 Istanbul Metro
 Public transport in Istanbul

References

Tram transport in Istanbul
Beyoğlu
Fatih
Zeytinburnu
Bakırköy
Güngören
Bağcılar